|}

The John Smith's Silver Cup Stakes is a Group 3 flat horse race in Great Britain open to horses aged four years or older.
It is run at York over a distance of 1 mile 5 furlongs and 188 yards (2,787 metres), and it is scheduled to take place each year in July. Prior to 2016 it was run as a handicap race and before 2018 it was also open to three-year-olds. In 2018 it was upgraded to Group 3 status and restricted to four-year-olds and up as part of the European Pattern Committee's commitment to improving the race programme for stayers in Europe.

Records

Leading jockey (4 wins):
Kieren Fallon – Benatom (1997), Distinction (2004), Lost Soldier Three (2005), Mount Athos (2012)

Leading trainer (3 wins):
Henry Cecil – Great Marquess (1991), Benatom (1997), Eminence Grise (2000)
 Luca Cumani  – Saxon Maid (1995), Lost Soldier Three (2005), Mount Athos (2012)

Winners

John Smith's Silver Cup Handicap
 Weights given in stones and pounds.

John Smith's Silver Cup Stakes

See also
Horse racing in Great Britain
List of British flat horse races

References

Racing Post:
, 
ifhaonline.org International Federation of Horseracing Authorities – John Smith's Silver Cup Stakes (2019).

Flat races in Great Britain
York Racecourse
Open long distance horse races
Recurring sporting events established in 1991
1991 establishments in England